Giulia Enrica Emmolo (born 16 October 1991) is an Italian water polo player. She was part of the Italian team that won the silver medal at the 2016 Olympics and the bronze medal at the 2015 World Championships.  She also competed at the 2012 Summer Olympics.

See also
 List of Olympic medalists in water polo (women)
 List of World Aquatics Championships medalists in water polo

References

External links
 
 

1991 births
Living people
People from Imperia
Italian female water polo players
Water polo drivers
Left-handed water polo players
Water polo players at the 2012 Summer Olympics
Water polo players at the 2016 Summer Olympics
Medalists at the 2016 Summer Olympics
Olympic silver medalists for Italy in water polo
World Aquatics Championships medalists in water polo
Competitors at the 2018 Mediterranean Games
Mediterranean Games medalists in water polo
Mediterranean Games silver medalists for Italy
Olympiacos Women's Water Polo Team players
Italian expatriate sportspeople in Greece
Sportspeople from the Province of Imperia
Expatriate water polo players
21st-century Italian women